The Papua New Guinea national under-23 football team, also known as PNG U23, represents Papua New Guinea at U23 tournaments. The team is considered to be the feeder team for the Papua New Guinea national football team

History
PNG U23 made five appearances so far at the OFC U23 Championship. Their best result was third place, achieved at the 2015 Pacific Games.

OFC 
The OFC Men's Olympic Qualifying Tournament is a tournament held once every four years to decide the only qualification spot for Oceania Football Confederation (OFC) and representatives at the Olympic Games.

Fixtures & results

2019

Current technical staff

Current squad
The following players were called to the squad for the 2019 OFC Men's Olympic Qualifying Tournament from 21 September - 5 October 2019.

List of coaches 

  Frank Farina (2012)
  Flemming Serritslev (2015)
  Percy Mataio (2019)
  Santiago Marina (2022-present)

Oceanian national under-23 association football teams
Under-23
1992 establishments in Papua New Guinea
Association football clubs established in 1992